Azoarcus toluclasticus is a gram negative bacterium from the genus of Azoarcus.

References 

Rhodocyclaceae
Bacteria described in 1999